Lo Chi Kwan (born 18 March 1981 in Hong Kong) is a former Hong Kong professional football player and the current assistant coach of Hong Kong Premier League club Eastern.

Biography

Kitchee career
Lo Chi Kwan scored a hat-trick in Kitchee's 6:0 win over Hong Kong Sapling on 25 September 2011.

Career statistics

International career
As of 9 February 2011

References

External links
Lo Chi Kwan at HKFA

1981 births
Living people
Hong Kong footballers
Hong Kong international footballers
Association football midfielders
Hong Kong Rangers FC players
Sun Hei SC players
Eastern Sports Club footballers
Kitchee SC players
Southern District FC players
Hong Kong First Division League players
Hong Kong Premier League players
Footballers at the 2002 Asian Games
Asian Games competitors for Hong Kong
Hong Kong League XI representative players